El Granero Dam (Spanish: Presa del Granero, also known as the Luis L. Leon Dam) is an embankment dam on the Rio Conchos in north-central Chihuahua, Mexico. The dam was completed in 1968 to provide irrigation and flood control for the lower Rio Conchos valley.

See also
List of dams and reservoirs#Mexico
List of lakes in Mexico

Dams in Mexico
Embankment dams
Dams completed in 1968